FDR: American Badass!  is a 2012 American comedy film spoofing the life and presidency of Franklin Delano Roosevelt. In this version of his life, FDR's polio is caused by werewolves. Werewolves are also behind the Axis Powers, and it is up to President Roosevelt to stop them and their plans for world domination. The film stars Barry Bostwick, Lin Shaye, and Bruce McGill.

The film premiered at the 2012 Phoenix Film Festival.

Cast 
 Barry Bostwick as Franklin Delano Roosevelt 
 Lin Shaye as Eleanor Roosevelt
 Bruce McGill as Louis
 Kevin Sorbo as Abraham Lincoln
 Ray Wise as Douglas MacArthur (Dougie Mac)
 Ross Patterson as Cleavon Buford
 Richard Riehle as Senator Bronson
 Paul Ben-Victor as Mussolini
 Keri Lynn Pratt as Marietta Buford
 Deon Richmond as George
 William Mapother as Dr. Ellington
 Ahmed Best as Curtis

See also
Abraham Lincoln: Vampire Hunter

References

External links
 

2012 films
American films about revenge
2010s English-language films
2010s American films